
Gmina Grójec is an urban-rural gmina (administrative district) in Grójec County, Masovian Voivodeship, in east-central Poland.

Villages
Apart from the town of Grójec, Gmina Grójec contains the villages and settlements of Bikówek, Częstoniew, Dębie, Duży Dół, Falęcin, Głuchów, Gościeńczyce, Grudzkowola, Janówek, Kępina, Kobylin, Kociszew, Kośmin, Krobów, Las Lesznowolski, Lesznowola, Lisówek, Maciejowice, Marianów, Mieczysławówka, Mięsy, Mirowice, Pabierowice, Piekiełko, Podole, Skurów, Słomczyn, Szczęsna, Uleniec, Wola Krobowska, Wola Worowska, Wólka Turowska, Worów, Zakrzewska Wola, Załącze, Zalesie and Żyrówek.

Neighbouring gminas
Gmina Grójec is bordered by the gminas of Belsk Duży, Chynów, Jasieniec, Pniewy, Prażmów and Tarczyn.

References
Polish official population figures 2006

Grojec
Grójec County